La Salle College Antipolo, or La Salle Antipolo, is a Lasallian educational institution located in Antipolo, Rizal, in the Philippines.  It was founded as a La Salle School by Br Rolando Dizon FSC, a past President of De La Salle University, Manila, in 1986.

History
The construction of the school began on March 16, 1985.  During this time, Kindergarten to Fourth Grade classes were temporarily held first at La Salle Green Hills. Construction was delayed because of the costs and logistics that were involved in building a school on a mountain.

Classes were finally transferred to the Antipolo campus on January 13, 1986, and were housed in two buildings.  A third building was completed in the summer of 1987, with a fourth one completed in 1989.  The school's St. Benilde Multi-purpose Hall was finished in 1991, while the high school and laboratory-library buildings were completed in 1994.

The Tertiary Education Unit was launched in 1998, with BS in Elementary Education and BS in Accountancy as the pioneer offerings.

In 2006, La Salle College became part of De La Salle Philippines, Inc.

In 2014, De La Salle–College of Saint Benilde acquired a building in the city proper for the Tertiary Education Unit of La Salle College Antipolo.

La Salle College celebrated its 30th anniversary last 2016. The senior high school also opened during this year.

In 2018, the Tertiary Education unit of La Salle College Antipolo merged with De La Salle-College of Saint Benilde following Benilde's construction of a multistorey building in the city proper of Antipolo. The campus is called DLS-CSB - Antipolo. With the college department spun off, La Salle College Antipolo focused on providing basic education from kindergarten to senior high school.

In 2019, LSCA opened the Pre-School campus at the town proper of Antipolo offering Nursery 1, Nursery 2, and Kindergarten. The campus is situated on Sen. L. Sumulong Street in San Jose, Antipolo.

Academics

At present LSCA offers Pre-School to Senior High School programs.

Senior High School Program:

 Academic Track: STEM, ABM, HUMSS, GAS 
 Technical Vocational Livelihood Track: Food Processing

Sports

La Salle College Antipolo's sports teams are called Voyagers. The official colors are green and white. The school has varsity teams for the sport of basketball, volleyball,  baseball, football, handball, taekwondo, badminton and table tennis.

 The sports programs had captured back-to-back WNCAA titles for badminton junior's division in 2006–2008. The grade school  boys' football team had won the DLSZ Football Fiesta championship (boys 13 division) in 2007. The team also took home the championship in the 2007 CALABARZON regional championship.
 The taekwondo, volleyball, futsal and girls' basketball teams had won second runner-up finishes in the 38th season of the WNCAA. Meanwhile, the table tennis team took home the first runner-up title of the WNCAA in 2006.
 The badminton team also took home championships in Toby's and Yonex badminton tourneys.

References

External links
 La Salle College Antipolo - official website

Antipolo
Education in Antipolo
Educational institutions established in 1985
Universities and colleges in Rizal
1985 establishments in the Philippines